Veronika Borisovna Belotserkovskaya (born 25 June 1970) is a Russian journalist, media manager, blogger, TV presenter, publisher and entrepreneur, author of popular cookbooks. She has also been a publisher at Sobaka.ru and also owns a culinary school in southern France.

Biography
She was born on 25 June 1970 in Odessa in the family of an engineer and a teacher of the Russian language. She attended the Saint Petersburg State Institute of Technology and later the High Courses for Scriptwriters and Film Directors.

Prior 2003, Belotserkovskaya was involved in television advertising and was co-owner and general director of the Trend St. Petersburg. She owned the Moscow and Saint Petersburg versions of Time Out before selling them to "C-Media" in 2014. A video version of the culinary recipes of Veronika Belotserkovskaya was released on the Domashny TV channel. In 2014, Belotserkovskaya starred in the ironic video clip of the Leningrad song "Patriotka".

In mid-2010s, she started a culinary blog on the blogging platform Live Journal. Her vivid photos and recipes were mixed with everyday lifestyle notes. Soon the blog attracted millions of followers. Belotserkovskaya developed the passion for cooking into further projects such as exclusive gastronomic tours and cooking classes with world top chefs in Provence, Tuscany, Piedmont and Sicily. By 2021, she had published several cookbooks, all of which were bestsellers.

2022 Russian invasion of Ukraine 

Belotserkovskaya publicly condemned 2022 Russian invasion of Ukraine via her social network accounts, mainly in Instagram.

On 16 March 2022, Belotserkovskaya became the first individual charged under the "fake news law" in absentia in relation to the war in Ukraine. Belotserkovskaya herself learned about the criminal case “from Telegram channels”. In April 2022,  authorities seized Belotserkovskaya’s property in Russia.

On February 6, 2023, she was sentenced in absentia to nine years incarceration as well as being banned from operating a website for a further five years following the end of her incarceration.

Personal life
Belotserkovskaya was first married to artist Yan Antonyshev with whom she had a son. Her second husband was businessman Boris Belotserkovsky. They had two sons before divorcing in 2017. Belotserkovskaya currently lives in southern France.

References

1970 births
Living people
Businesspeople from Saint Petersburg
20th-century Russian businesswomen
20th-century Russian businesspeople
21st-century Russian businesswomen
21st-century Russian businesspeople
20th-century Russian women writers
21st-century Russian women writers
20th-century Russian photographers
21st-century Russian photographers
Russian expatriates in France
Russian publishers (people)
Russian socialites
Russian women photographers
Russian women television presenters
Saint Petersburg State Institute of Technology alumni
Russian activists against the 2022 Russian invasion of Ukraine
People listed in Russia as foreign agents